Lindsey Erin Alley (born December 6, 1977) is an American actress and singer, who for several years lived in New York City and now resides in Los Angeles. She is known for Bedtime Stories (2008), Ernest Saves  Christmas (1988) and Jessica Jones (2015).

Early life
Alley was born in Lakeland, Florida.

Career
She began acting at the age of six. In her first starring role, she played the role of Patsy in the movie Ernest Saves Christmas in 1988. From 1989 to 1994, she performed as a mouseketeer in The Disney Channel's revival of the Mickey Mouse Club (later known as MMC), on which she remained until the show was canceled in 1994. Two years after the show ended, Alley graduated from Lakeland Senior High School in 1996. Alley continued her education at the University of Missouri, receiving her Bachelor of Arts in theater with honors in 2000.

Alley also had a brief stint in an on-screen character role of Lisa Seltzer on WSL RollerJam in 2002 from midway through the season to the end of the series.

Alley appeared in her own play, a one-woman show titled Look, Ma...No Ears!, a play on which she collaborated with Robert Stein and Stephen Winer. The play, directed by Ben Rimalower, premiered in April 2006.

Alley appeared in the production of the musical Having It All at the NoHo Arts Center in Los Angeles in 2011, for which she received an Ovation Award nomination for Best Actress in a Leading Role. She reprised the role in the Laguna Playhouse production in March of its 2013 season. In the same year, she appeared on an episode of How I Met Your Mother titled "No Questions Asked".

Filmography

Film

Television

References

External links
 Official Website
 
 

1977 births
Living people
American child actresses
American stage actresses
American television actresses
Actresses from Florida
Mouseketeers
Musicians from Lakeland, Florida
University of Missouri alumni
Lakeland High School (Lakeland, Florida) alumni
21st-century American women